Shorter, Faster, Louder is the second album by the Philadelphia hardcore punk band Kid Dynamite. Their final album, it was released in 2000 by Jade Tree.

Critical reception
Exclaim! wrote: "Recalling the early punk of Minor Threat and 7 Seconds, [Kid Dynamite] wail and woah about youth culture on standout tracks like 'Living Daylights,' 'Death and Taxes' and 'There's a Party [sic].'" Nuvo called the album "genre-defining." CMJ New Music Report called it "a punk rock marathon, designed for moshing until the audience drops from exhaustion."

Track listing
 "Pits and Poisoned Apples" - 0:48
 "Death and Taxes" - 1:52
 "Cheap Shot Youth Anthem" - 2:10
 "Cop Out" - 1:30
 "Handy With the Tongue Sword" - 0:22
 "Living Daylights" - 1:57
 "Introduction to the Opposites" - 1:19
 "Gate 68" - 1:19
 "Troy's Bucket" - 1:29
 "Rufus Wants a Hug" - 1:45
 "Got a Minute?" - 1:00
 "The Penske File" - 0:23
 "Rid of the Losers, Bring on the Cruisers" - 1:53
 "Three's a Party" - 1:03
 "S.O.S." - 1:42
 "Two for Flinching" - 0:10
 "Birthday" - 2:34
 "Give 'em the Ripped One" - 1:58

Credits 
 Jason Shevchuk – vocals
 Dr. Dan Yemin – guitar
 Michael Cotterman – bass
 Dave Wagenschutz – drums
 Dave Hause – backing vocals
 Ernie Parada – additional vocals on "Birthday," backing vocals
 Alison Mennor – additional vocals on "Three's A Party"

References

2000 albums
Jade Tree (record label) albums
Kid Dynamite (band) albums
Albums produced by Steve Evetts